Fritillaria cirrhosa, common name yellow Himalayan fritillary, is an Asian species of herbaceous plant in the lily family, native to China (Gansu, Qinghai, Sichuan, Tibet, Yunnan), the Indian Subcontinent (Nepal, Pakistan, India, Bhutan), and Myanmar.

Flowers are bell-shaped, yellowish-green to brownish-purple flowers which are usually with a chequered pattern in dull purple. It is in danger of extinction, due to be being aggressively collected to make a traditional Chinese medicine, Bulbus fritillariae cirrhosae.

Taxonomy
Formerly included

Several names have been coined at infraspecific levels (variety, subspecies, and form) for plants once believed to belong to Fritillaria cirrhosa. None of these is currently recognized. Some of the names are regarded as synonyms of Fritillaria cirrhosa not deserving recognition (see synonym list at right). A few others are considered as belonging to distinct species. Those are:
Fritillaria cirrhosa var. brevistigma, now called Fritillaria yuzhongensis
Fritillaria cirrhosa var. ecirrhosa, now called Fritillaria sichuanica
Fritillaria cirrhosa f. glabra, now called Fritillaria taipaiensis

References

External links
Flora Reipublicae Popularis Sinicae, 川贝母 Fritillaria cirrhosa D. Don   in Chinese with many color photos

cirrhosa
Flora of Asia
Plants described in 1825